The Lords of Rubempré were feudal lords, and the ancestors of the current Princes of Rubempré, belonging to the Belgian Nobility. 

Rubempré is currently in Somme; Picardia; France. Baldwin is the First Lord of Rubempré mentioned in 1202. In the 16th century the family was allied to the house of  Bourbon-Rubempré.

Lords of Rubempré

Princes of Mérode - Rubempré 

The title was incorporated by heritage to the House of Mérode, who stil uses this title upon the current generation. The 2nd Prince inherited the feudal function of Grand Huntsman of Brabant.

References

 
Ru